Colossus Bridge may refer to:

 Colossus Bridge (Philadelphia), a former bridge across the Schuylkill River near Philadelphia
 Colossus Bridge (video game), a 1986 card video game